Los Invasores de Nuevo León are a Mexican Norteño set founded in 1977. Led by Lalo Mora, the first members of the group was Eduardo "Lalo" Mora, Isidro "Chilo" Rodriguez, Luis González y Arturo Vargas.

Javier Ríos was the accordion player of Luis y Julian. Then all change and the next Los Invasores was Lalo Mora, Javier Rios, Homero de Leon and Eliud Lopez.  The group would become very popular on both sides of the Texas-Mexico border during the 1980s and 1990s. Many of their songs are still played on radio to this day, such as Laurita Garza, Eslabón por Eslabón, Ni Dada La Quiero, Amor a la Ligera, Ni que Tuvieras tanta Suerte, Playa Sola, Aguanta Corazón, Mi Casa Nueva and A Mí que Me Quedo. Singer Lalo Mora left for a solo career with EMI Records in 1993. The group's songs have included political themes, and criticism of US involvement in Latin America.

Members
 Javier Ríos (Líder del Grupo desde 1993, Acordeón y 2da. Voz) (1980 - presente)
 Eliud López                 (Batería) (1980 - presente)
 Rolando Marroquín           (1ra. Voz, Vocalista) (1997 - presente)
 Javier Benavides            (Animador) (2000 - presente)
 Ángel Hernández             (Bajo Sexto y Acordeón) (2012 - presente)
 Luis Perales                (Bajo Eléctrico) (2014 - presente)
 Francisco Ríos              (Bajo Sexto) (2014 - presente)

Former Members
 Eduardo Lalo Mora (Bajo Sexto y 1ra. Voz) (1980 - 1993)
 Homero De León (Bajo Eléctrico) (1980 - 2013)
 Isaías Lucero (Bajo Sexto y 1ra. Voz) (1993 - 1996)
  Rigo Marroquín (Bajo Sexto) (1997 - 2011)

Discography

Álbumes De Estudio

 El Puente Roto (1980)
 Laurita Garza (1980)
 Concha Del Alma (1981)
 Castígame (1981)
 Ni Dada La Quiero (1982)
 Mi Flor De Naranjo (1982)
 Aguanta Corazón (1983)
 Amor A La Ligera (1983)
 El Preso De Nuevo León (1984)
 Cariño (1984)
 Camino Equivocado (1985)
 Que Valor De Mujer (1985)
 Corridos De Pegue (1986)
 De Ser Tu Dueño (1986)
 Lupe Ruvalcaba (1987)
 Mil Pedazos (1987)
 Trono Caído (1988)
 Bajo Mil Llaves (1988)
 Es Demasiado Tarde (1989)
 La Ley Del Corrido (1989)
 Corazón De Piedra (1990)
 Te Llevaste Lo Mejor (1990)
 15 Boleros De Oro (1991)
 15 Boleros De Oro Vol. 2 (1991)
 20 Corridos Fregones (1992)
 Embárgame A Mi (1993)
 Ventanas Al Viento (1994)
 Me Rindo (1995)
 Jardín Del Amor (1996)
 Corridos De Alto Poder (1996)
 Leyendas (1997)
 Vuelvo Contigo (1998)
 De Vida O Muerte (1999)
 Boleros (2000)
 Tiempo Al Tiempo (2001)
 Hasta El Final (2002)
 15 Clásicos Al Estilo De Los Invasores De Nuevo León (2003)
 Señal De Alerta (2004)
 Los Más Buscados (2005)
 Corridos De Peligro (2006)
 No Soy De Palo (2007)
 Con Tal De Que Me Olvides (2008)
 Amor Aventurero (2009)
 Déjate Llevar (2010)
 30 Aniversario en vivo (2011)
 Aferrado Al Amor (2012)
 El Reencuentro Vol. 1 en vivo (2013)
 El Reencuentro Vol. 2 en vivo (2013)
 Amistades (2014)
 Mi Héroe (2015)
 Sin Presumir (2016)
 No. 50 (2017)
 Otra Era (2018)
 Del Corazón A La Piel (2019)
 Con Invitados A Otro Nivel Vol. 1 (2020)
 40 Aniversario (Vol.1, Vol.2, Vol.3) en vivo (2021)

Albumes De Recopilación

 15 Éxitos 15 Éxitos Vol. 2 15 Éxitos Vol. 3 12 Éxitos Norteños 12 Éxitos Norteños Vol. 2 Corridos Con... los invasores de nuevo león La Historia Mix La Historia Vol. 2 20 Corridos Fregones Vol. 2 Ayer, Hoy Y Siempre Quedate En Casa... grandes éxitos''

References

External links
 Los Invasores de Nuevo León - chart history at Billboard website

Musical groups from Nuevo León
EMI Latin artists